Glicko  is a village in the administrative district of Gmina Nowogard, within Goleniów County, West Pomeranian Voivodeship, in north-western Poland. Glicko was a contested territory and was formally a part of Germany through World War II, but separated, becoming part of Poland in 1945.

References

Glicko